Brooke Totman is an American actor. Totman is most notable for her time as cast member on the sketch comedy series MADtv.

Life and career
Brooke Totman was born on December 27, 1978, in Roseburg, Oregon and graduated from Grants Pass High. During her senior year, she received a college scholarship from the America's Junior Miss Program after she won the title of Oregon's Junior Miss. Totman majored in Theatre Performance at the University of Oregon where she was awarded the Outstanding Undergraduate Performance scholarship by her professors. She spent her last semester abroad, studying Theatre Criticism in London. After college, Totman moved to Los Angeles where she spent four years training at the improv and sketch comedy theatre, the Groundlings, eventually becoming a member of their Sunday company.

During her time in L.A., Totman joined the television series MADtv, as a featured cast member. Brooke was noted for her celebrity impressions of Ann-Margret and Jennifer Love Hewitt, and also premiered original characters that she developed during her time at the Groundlings. After her tenure on MADtv Totman made several guest appearances on The King of Queens, Less Than Perfect,  Life After First Failure, Portlandia, Documentary Now! and more. She also starred in the critically acclaimed series The Benefits of Gusbandry on Amazon.

Brooke is the co-founder and artistic director of the 21ten Theatre where she writes, directs and acts. She's the author of 2 episodic pilots and one full-length feature, both represented by Artists First Management in L.A. In her free time she teaches acting classes and works as a public speaking coach.

Television appearances

References

External links

 http://thebenefitsofgusbandry.com

Living people
Actresses from Oregon
American television actresses
American women comedians
American sketch comedians
21st-century American comedians
Year of birth missing (living people)
21st-century American actresses